Lukavice is a municipality and village in Chrudim District in the Pardubice Region of the Czech Republic. It has about 900 inhabitants.

Administrative parts
Villages of Loučky, Lukavička, Radochlín, Vížky and Výsonín are administrative parts of Lukavice.

References

External links

 

Villages in Chrudim District